Abdalla Al Refaey (born 19 November 1995) is an Egyptian professional footballer who plays as a defender for Emirati club Khor Fakkan on loan from Al Wahda.

Career
Al Refaey signed his first professional contract with Al Wahda on 18 August 2018. On 13 September, he left Al-Wahda and signed with Al Dhafra on a season-long loan.

Career statistics

References

1995 births
Living people
Egyptian footballers
Association football defenders
Al Wahda FC players
Al Dhafra FC players
Khor Fakkan Sports Club players
UAE Pro League players
Egyptian expatriate footballers
Expatriate footballers in the United Arab Emirates
Egyptian expatriate sportspeople in the United Arab Emirates